Wittdün (Öömrang: Witjdün) is a municipality on the island of Amrum in the district of Nordfriesland in Schleswig-Holstein, Germany.

History 

Unlike the other villages of Amrum, Wittdün is a relatively young settlement. It was founded in 1890 as a seaside resort next to a new ferry port connecting the island to mainland Nordfriesland. The reason for founding this new village was the fear of many islanders of a decline of their Frisian culture due to the influx of tourists from the south. So, many Amrumers thought that concentrating the emerging seaside tourism in a single village would protect the local community from malign influences.

Until December 31, 2006, the Wittdün municipality, together with Nebel and Norddorf formed the Amt Amrum.

Politics 

Since the municipal elections of 2008, the Wittdüner Bürgerblock holds five seats of Wittdün's council, the CDU holds two.

Economy 

Wittdün is a seaside resort, tourism is the main source of income. In 2005, 374,000 lodgings were registered. There is a sea water swimming pool and a centre for thalassotherapy. Moreover, Amrum's youth hostel is located in Wittdün. The village hosts Amrum's only ferry terminal.

References

External links 

 Wittdün at Amrum Touristik

Amrum
Nordfriesland